Réunionnais of Indian origin are people of Indian origin in Réunion. They form two ethnic groups on the island, Malbars (Tamils) and Zarabes (Muslims).

Origins
Originally brought in as indentured laborers, as in Mauritius, they were mostly of South Indian Tamil origin. The next largest ethnicity were North Indian Hindus, speaking Hindi, Bhojpuri and Gujarati. The smallest group were Muslims (from North, South and West India, mainly from the modern day region of Gujarat.) There were also later emigrants, mostly Hindu traders and businessmen. In Réunion, Indians from South India, often Hindu, are known as Malbars and Muslim Indians from North and West India are known as Zarabes.

Today
Indo-Réunionnais people have affected the culture of Réunion, bringing Indian cuisine as well as flora and fauna to the island. The Indo-Réunionnais Hindus have mainly assimilated with other ethnicities on the island.

Malbars

Originally brought in as indentured labourers as in Mauritius, they were mostly from South Indian Tamil.
Tamils in Reunion are gradual awakening and desire to their ancestors' culture, and started studying their language and religions especially from Tamil Nadu and Pondicherry.
They also now wanted to translate their newly acquired civic and political rights into a gradual and increasing participation in local and other elections:
 Mr Jean-Paul Virapoullé, Mayor of Saint-André (1972-2008 and since 2014), Deputy of the National Assembly (1986-1997), Senator (2001-2011) and First Vice President of the General Council of Reunion.
 Mrs Nadia Ramassamy, Deputy of the National Assembly since 2017, previously Vice President of the General Council.
 Mr Saminadin Axel Kichenin, Mayor of Sainte-Marie (1983-1990), Vice President of the General Council.
Mrs Denise Nillameyom, Deputy Mayor of Le Tampon.

Zarabes

Zarabes is the name given to the Muslim community of Réunion. The Muslims migrated to Réunion in mid-nineteenth century. Zarabes are mostly South Asian and specifically from the modern state Gujarat in India.

Demographic factors
Many are Christians and Hindus, including some who are nominally Christian but include Hindu practises. There is a significant Muslim minority known as Zarabes. Others are Sikh, Baháʼí or non-religious. Hare Krishna is also practised in Réunion. They speak Réunion Creole and French. There are a handful of schools where Indian languages such as Tamil may be studied as a third or fourth language.

References

Ethnic groups in Réunion
Reunionnaise, Indo-
Indian diaspora in Africa